Shkumbin Arsllani (born 27 February 1980) is an Albanian retired football player from Macedonia, who has played for Finnish side JJK.

International career
He made his debut for Macedonia in a February 2003 friendly match against Croatia and has earned a total of 2 caps, scoring no goals. His second and final international was a friendly against Poland in the same month.

References

Guardian Football

External links

1980 births
Living people
Albanian footballers from North Macedonia
Association football defenders
Macedonian footballers
North Macedonia international footballers
FK Napredok players
FK Rabotnički players
FK Renova players
FK Vëllazërimi 77 players
JJK Jyväskylä players
Macedonian First Football League players
Veikkausliiga players
Macedonian expatriate footballers
Expatriate footballers in Finland
Macedonian expatriate sportspeople in Finland